The 1969–70 Michigan State Spartans men's basketball team represented Michigan State University in the 1969–70 NCAA Division I men's basketball season as members of the Big Ten Conference. They played their home games at Jenison Fieldhouse in East Lansing, Michigan and were coached by Gus Ganakas in his first year as head coach of the Spartans. The Spartans finished the season 9–15, 5–9 in Big Ten play to finish in a three-way tie for sixth place.

Prior to the season, on September 10, 1969, the Spartans head coach, John E. Benington suffered a heart attack and died after jogging at Jenison Fieldhouse at the age of 47. Ganakas, an assistant under Benington, was promoted to head coach for the season.

Previous season 
The Spartans finished the 1968–69 season 11–12, 6–8 in Big Ten play to finish in a three-way tie for fifth place.

Roster and statistics 

Source

Schedule and results 

|-
!colspan=9 style=| Regular season

References 

Michigan State Spartans men's basketball seasons
Michigan State
Michigan State Spartans basketball
Michigan State Spartans basketball